Sebastian Köber (born 28 May 1979) is a German boxer, who won the Heavyweight bronze medal at the 2000 Summer Olympics in Sydney, Australia. Three years later, at the 2003 World Amateur Boxing Championships in Bangkok, he once again finished in third place.

Amateur
 German Super Heavyweight Champion 2003, German Junior Champion 1996, 1997

Heavyweight 201 lb/91 kg limit
1997 won the European Junior Championships at Heavyweight in Birmingham (England), beating Aleksander Jacenko (Ukraine) in the final.
2000 competed at the European Championships in Tampere, Finland. Result was:
 Lost to Jackson Chanet (France) PTS
2000 won a bronze medal in the Sydney Olympics at Heavyweight, representing Germany. Results were:
 Defeated Magomed Aripgadjiev (Azerbaijan) PTS (9-4)
 Defeated Mark Simmons (Canada) RSC-3
 Lost to Félix Savón (Cuba) PTS (8-19)
2001 competed at the World Championships in Belfast, Northern Ireland at Heavyweight. Lost the quarterfinal to David Haye on points.

Superheavyweight
2002 won a bronze medal at the European Championships at Superheavyweight in Perm, Russia. Results were:
 Defeated Chaba Kurtuts (Hungary) PTS (32-11)
 Lost to Alexander Povetkin (Russia) RSC-4
2002 won the Military Championship in Curragh (Ireland), beating Roberto Cammarelle (Italy) in the final 16-7
2003 2nd place at the European Union Championships in Strasbourg (France), lost to Modo Sallah (Sweden) by Walkover
2003 won a bronze medal at the World Championships in Bangkok, Thailand. Results were:
 Defeated Mukhtarkhan Dildabekov (Kazakhstan) PTS (20-19)
 Defeated Jaroslav Jaksto (Lithuania) PTS (27-15)
 Lost to Pedro Carrion (Cuba) PTS (18-26)
2004 competed at the European Championships in Pula, Croatia. Result was:
 Lost to Roberto Cammarelle (Italy) RSC
2004 Köber qualified for the 2004 Summer Olympics by ending up in first place at the 1st AIBA European 2004 Olympic Qualifying Tournament in Plovdiv, Bulgaria.
2004 competed in the Athens Olympics. Result was:
 Lost to Mukhtarkhan Dildabekov (Kazakhstan) PTS (18-28)
2005 won the Military World Championships in Pretoria, South Africa. Results were:
Defeated Magomed Abdusalamov (Russia) PTS (16-15)
Defeated Martin Tcho (Cameroon) PTS (27-2)
Defeated Jaroslav Jaksto (Lithuania) PTS (14-9)
Defeated Jack Saye Sr. (USA) PTS (12-5)

Pro
Köber turned pro in 2006, and won his first nineteen fights against unknowns before losing two decisions to extremely limited opponents, one with a losing record.

External links
 News and Pictures of Sebastian Köber
 

1979 births
Living people
Boxers at the 2000 Summer Olympics
Boxers at the 2004 Summer Olympics
Olympic boxers of Germany
Olympic bronze medalists for Germany
Sportspeople from Frankfurt (Oder)
Olympic medalists in boxing
German male boxers
AIBA World Boxing Championships medalists
Medalists at the 2000 Summer Olympics
Heavyweight boxers